The Cotswold School is an 11 to 18 academy school located in Bourton-on-the-Water, Gloucestershire, Great Britain. The school achieved academy status in September 2010. The principal from 2012 is Mr Will Morgan. In 2023, the schools roll in sits at 1430 (with approximately 290 of those students in The Academy’s sixth form).

In November 2022, The Cotswold School was named The Sunday Times  Southwest Comprehensive School of the Year 2023, ranked by their examination results from 2021/2022. The tables are based on the percentage of A-Level results at A*-B and GCSE’s at 9-7. Three quarters of the A-Level grades collectively achieved by our 410 students were at A*, A or B. Just over half of all grades were either A* or A, and 94% were at A*to C. In GCSEs, 41% of grades achieved were at 9-7 with 83% of students achieved the benchmark of five or more 9-4 grades, including Mathematics and English.

In 2015/16, The Cotswold School was named The Sunday Times Comprehensive School of the Year.

History
The Cotswold School opened in 1988 following the amalgamation of Bourton Vale Secondary Modern (in Bourton on the Water) and  Westwood's Grammar School (Northleach).  The first head teacher was Mr Sanders and first chair of governors was Mavis, Viscountess Dunrossil.  The roll was just over 400 students and 35 staff.  The school emblem, comprising tree, dry stone wall and river was devised in 1988 by Gareth Harris (then 10 years old) and fellow pupils at Chedworth Primary School who entered the competition to design a new school crest for the new "The Cotswold School".

Former head teachers were Mr Sanders (September 1988 – August 1995) and Mrs Holland (September 1995 – December 2011).

Today
The school roll in September 2022 stands at 1430 students and 140 staff. The last 30 years have seen an extensive programme of building. In the last 5 years, a new Sixth Form study suite and common room have been built; refurbished and newly equipped science laboratories; a gymnasium extension to the sports hall; and a 2 storey, 10 classroom English block with communal learning space, study rooms and department office, which was opened in 2020.

The school gained specialisms for languages (2002) and science (2006) as part of the now defunct specialist schools programme.

The extension to the sixth form and science blocks was officially opened by Nigel Twiston-Davies in April 2009. The new £1.5 million sports hall, with changing rooms and a community room alongside, first opened in November 2009; it was officially opened by the former England cricket captain Mike Gatting in July 2010.

The mathematics block was officially opened by Geoffrey Clifton-Brown MP and Mavis, Viscountess Dunrossil as part of the school's 25th anniversary celebrations during the academic year 2013/2014. 

The Sixth Form study suite was officially opened by Adam Henson in March 2018. The English block was officially opened by Emma and Simon Keswick in November 2022.

During the building of the extensions, it was discovered that the school is situated on a Roman cemetery which was found to also contain Iron Age graves.

Ofsted reports and accolades 
In March 2015, Ofsted judged The Cotswold School 'Outstanding' across all categories. This was the fourth consecutive 'Outstanding' inspection carried out at the school.

 An ‘Outstanding’ 11–18 School, Ofsted 2002, 2006, 2009 & 2015.
 The Sunday Times Southwest Comprehensive of the Year 2023
 International School Award 2022-25
 Outstanding Academy September 2010.
 Good Schools Guide 2015.
 The Sunday Times' Comprehensive School of the Year 2015/16.
 National Teaching School, designated by the National College of Teaching and Leadership 2016.
 The Sunday Times Parent Power Schools Guide 2023 Southwest Comprehensive of the Year.

Alumni

Westwood's Grammar School
 Harriet Green OBE, chief executive from 2012 to 2014 of Thomas Cook Group
 Wilf Paish MBE, athletics coach

The Cotswold School
Alice Powell, racing driver
Sam Twiston-Davies

References

External links 
 

Secondary schools in Gloucestershire
Educational institutions established in 1988
1988 establishments in England
Cotswold District
Academies in Gloucestershire